The Roman Catholic Diocese of Soacha is a diocese located in the city of Soacha in the Ecclesiastical province of Bogotá in Colombia.

History
 6 August 2003: Established as Diocese of Soacha from the Metropolitan Archdiocese of Bogotá

Ordinaries
Daniel Caro Borda (2003.08.06 – 2016.06.28)
José Daniel Falla Robles (2016.06.29 – 2021.05.01)

See also 
Roman Catholicism in Colombia

Sources

External links
 Catholic Hierarchy
 GCatholic.org

Roman Catholic dioceses in Colombia
Roman Catholic Ecclesiastical Province of Bogotá
Christian organizations established in 2003
Roman Catholic dioceses and prelatures established in the 21st century